The 2017 AFC U-19 Women's Championship was the 9th edition of the AFC U-19 Women's Championship, the biennial international youth football championship organised by the Asian Football Confederation (AFC) for the women's under-19 national teams of Asia. The tournament was held in China for the third consecutive edition between 15–28 October 2017, with a total of eight teams competing.

The top three teams of the tournament qualified for the 2018 FIFA U-20 Women's World Cup in France as the AFC representatives.

Qualification

The draw for the qualifiers was held on 19 May 2016. Four teams qualified directly for the final tournament by their 2015 performance, while the other entrants competed in the qualifying stage for the remaining four spots. The qualifiers were held from 27 October to 6 November 2016, with Group C postponed to 20–24 December 2016 due to the death of King Bhumibol Adulyadej.

Qualified teams
The following eight teams qualified for the final tournament.

Venues
The tournament was held in Nanjing, at the Jiangning Sports Center and the Jiangsu Training Base Stadium.

Draw
The draw was held on 28 April 2017, 16:00 MYT (UTC+8), at the AFC House in Kuala Lumpur, Malaysia. The eight teams were drawn into two groups of four teams. The teams were seeded according to their performance in the 2015 AFC U-19 Women's Championship final tournament and qualification, with the hosts China automatically seeded and assigned to Position A1 in the draw.

Match officials
A total of 8 referees and 10 assistant referees were appointed for the final tournament.

Referees
 Kate Jacewicz
 Qin Liang
 Saltanat Noroozi
 Kajiyama Fusako
 Thein Thein Aye
 Ri Hyang-ok
 Oh Hyeon-jeong
 Anna Sidorova

Assistant referees
 Renae Coghill
 Bao Mengxiao
 Fang Yan
 Uvena Fernandes
 Ensieh Khabaz
 Maiko Hagio
 Naomi Teshirogi
 Hong Kum-Nyo
 Kim Kyoung-Min
 Zilola Rahmatova

Squads

Players born between 1 January 1998 and 31 December 2001 are eligible to compete in the tournament. Each team must register a squad of minimum 18 players and maximum 23 players, minimum three of whom must be goalkeepers (Regulations Articles 31.4 and 31.5).

Group stage
The top two teams of each group advance to the semi-finals.

Tiebreakers
Teams are ranked according to points (3 points for a win, 1 point for a draw, 0 points for a loss), and if tied on points, the following tiebreaking criteria are applied, in the order given, to determine the rankings (Regulations Article 11.5):
Points in head-to-head matches among tied teams;
Goal difference in head-to-head matches among tied teams;
Goals scored in head-to-head matches among tied teams;
If more than two teams are tied, and after applying all head-to-head criteria above, a subset of teams are still tied, all head-to-head criteria above are reapplied exclusively to this subset of teams;
Goal difference in all group matches;
Goals scored in all group matches;
Penalty shoot-out if only two teams are tied and they met in the last round of the group;
Disciplinary points (yellow card = 1 point, red card as a result of two yellow cards = 3 points, direct red card = 3 points, yellow card followed by direct red card = 4 points);
Drawing of lots.

All times are local, CST (UTC+8).

Group A

Group B

Knockout stage
In the knockout stage, extra time and penalty shoot-out are used to decide the winner if necessary, except for the third place match where penalty shoot-out (no extra time) is used to decide the winner.

Bracket

Semi-finals
Winners qualify for 2018 FIFA U-20 Women's World Cup.

Third place match
Winner qualifies for 2018 FIFA U-20 Women's World Cup.

Final

Winners

Qualified teams for FIFA U-20 Women's World Cup
The following three teams from AFC qualified for the 2018 FIFA U-20 Women's World Cup.

1 Bold indicates champions for that year. Italic indicates hosts for that year.

Awards
The following awards were given at the conclusion of the tournament.

Goalscorers
6 goals

 Sung Hyang-sim

5 goals

 Saori Takarada

3 goals

 Alex Chidiac
 Remy Siemsen
 Hinata Miyazawa
 Riko Ueki
 Kim Pom-ui
 Ri Hae-yon
 Kim So-eun

2 goals

 Liu Jing
 Mizuka Sato
 An Song-ok
 Ju Hyo-sim
 Diyorakhon Khabibullaeva

1 goal

 Princess Ibini
 Rachel Lowe
 Chen Yuanmeng
 He Luyao
 Jin Kun
 Xie Qiwen
 Jun Endo
 Honoka Hayashi
 Oto Kanno
 Rina Mehara
 Asato Miyagawa
 Mami Muraoka
 Nana Ono
 Kim Eun-soul
 Mun Eun-ju
 Orrapan Bungthong
 Kanyanat Chetthabutr
 Hà Thị Nhài
 Nguyễn Thị Tuyết Ngân

1 own goal

 Chen Qiaozhu (against Japan)
 Tipkritta Onsamai (against China)

References

External links
, the-AFC.com
AFC U-19 Women's Championship 2017, stats.the-AFC.com

 
2017
U-19 Women's Championship
2017 in women's association football
2017 in youth association football
2017 in Chinese football
2017 AFC U-19 Women's Championship
Sport in Nanjing
October 2017 sports events in Asia